Albusavadi (also Romanized as Ālbūsavādī) is a village in Jaffal Rural District, in the Central District of Shadegan County, Khuzestan Province, Iran. At the 2006 census, the population totaled 597 people across 108 families.

References 

Populated places in Shadegan County